Dr. Shankarrao Chavan Government Medical College (SCGMC) & Hospital - Vishnupuri, Nanded  is Government Medical College of Maharashtra Government situated in Nanded city of Maharashtra.
It was established in 1988 due to efforts of former Chief Minister of Maharashtra Shankarrao Chavan, and today it is named after him. The college transferred to the Vishnupuri area of the city in 2015 and is located on the Nanded-Latur State Highway.

Facilities 

It has a 600 bedded hospital with an excellent facility of modern equipment. It also has 32 Operation Theatres in the OT Complex consisting of modern laminar OT's and centralized Air-conditioning. It has huge inflow of patients from Nanded city and District as well as neighboring districts of Parbhani, Hingoli and Yavatmal as well as the border districts of Telangana state. Due to large patient load and limited resources, rush and cleanliness and patient care are big problems. But still it's only resort for poor and deprived from society.

History of Institute 

Initially, started in 1988, in the Vazirabad area of Nanded attached to the Guru Gobind Singhji Memorial civil hospital the hospital has grown into a much bigger hospital in an area of 115 acres campus after its shift to the vishnupuri area in the outskirts of the city offering a huge scope for expansion in future. It also has AC classrooms and a well equipped library with air-conditioners having a huge availability of over 17000 books to the students.

Admissions

Undergraduate 
Every year 150 students are admitted for the  course of MBBS.

Postgraduate 
 MD Medicine
 MD Pediatrics
 MD Pulmonary Medicine
 MD Pharmacology 
 MD microbiology 
 MD Pathology 
 MD Physiology 
 MD Anatomy 
 MD Biochemistry
 MS Orthopedics
 MS General Surgery
 MS Ophthalmology

Academics 

Courses available in SCGMC 
 MBBS 
 MD/MS
 CPS Diploma

Achievements 

Recently Former Dean Dr. Dilip Mhaisekar was appointed as the new Vice-Chancellor of Maharashtra University of Health Sciences, Nashik

References

Medical colleges in Maharashtra
Education in Nanded
Educational institutions established in 1988
1988 establishments in Maharashtra
Affiliates of Maharashtra University of Health Sciences